Walter Swennen  (born 1946 in Brussels, Belgium) is a Belgian artist who lives and works in Brussels.

Work 

Originally trained as a printmaker, Swennen’s early career revolved around poetry, philosophy and artistic happenings. In the early 1980s, Swennen shifted to painting as his primary means of expression.

Swennen explores and challenges the associative qualities of language, legibility, subjectivity and symbolic meaning, giving his work a personal semiotic quality. Central to his practice is his belief in the total autonomy of the artwork. Swennen’s work can be construed as an ongoing exploration into the nature and problems of painting (its potential and limitations), the fundamental question of what to paint (subject matter), and how (technique). Swennen sees each canvas as an exercise in painting, a place where ‘the artist simultaneously moves, thinks and acts’. His works are akin to thought processes given material form.

Swennen works without one signature style and employs his background in philosophy, poetry and psychoanalysis to create his works. His paintings are devoid of frameworks and perspectival elements, uncoupled from reality and conventional associations. To Swennen, painting is both object and subject: a material entity unto itself in which the ‘how’ determines the ‘what'. His paintings are not necessarily ‘about’ anything, but if his paintings had a meaning, it would be, in the words of the writer Hans Theys, ‘in a material sense, not in the form of a code that needs to be deciphered.’

Biography

Early years and education 
Swennen was born in Forest, Brussels on 27 February 1946, the second of six children.

Swennen started painting classes at the age of fourteen while attending the Saint-Louis College in Brussels. After high school, Swennen enrolled as a philosophy student at the Saint-Louis University, Brussels but quit after one year and moved on to the engraving department of the Académie Royale des Beaux-Arts. In 1967, Swennen became a candidate in Psychology at the Université catholique de Louvain (UCL). Swennen received his degree in Psychology in 1973.

Poetry and happenings 
Swennen began writing poetry and giving live readings around 1965, after his discovery of the poetry of the Beat Generation. Swennen befriended Marcel Broodthaers, who organised artistic happenings and to whom Swennen dedicated the poem Ballade Pop (1965). Reading Tristan Tzara’s Dada Manifesto prompted Swennen into a three year long period of ephemeral actions and collaborations: he participated in Au pied de la lettre, a happening centered on the pitfalls of poetic communication, organised and hosted by Broodthaers.
When studying Psychology at the Université Catholique de Louvain (UCL), Swennen organised several politically charged happenings off-campus and he formed the short-lived Groupe Accuse. In 1977, Swennen became Professor of Psychoanalysis at the École de Recherche Graphique (ERG).

Painting 
Swennen shifted to painting in the early 1980s. In 1981, he was selected for the national award show for young painters at the Centre for Fine Arts, Brussels. That same year, Gallery Patrick Verelst gave Swennen his first solo show, followed in 1982 by two group shows focused on contemporary painting in Belgium: La Magie de l’image/De Magie van het beeld, at the Centre for Fine Arts, Brussels, and Le Désir pictural/Het Picturaal verlangen, at Galerie Isy Brachot in Brussels. The work Swennen exhibited combined action painting with a simplified multiplicity of languages, embracing chance when choosing subject matter.

In 1984, Swennen moved to Antwerp and the following years are marked by a number of exhibitions: a gallery exhibition at Micheline Szwajcer (1984); the Vereniging voor het Museum van Hedendaagse Kunst, Ghent (1984) and his first solo presentation at a public institution, the Centre for Fine Arts, Brussels (1986). Over the course of the following five years, The Flemish Community actively started to acquire his work.

When Swennen was 40, he wrote ‘... succeed in painting whatever; that is the ideal. (…) The key: premeditation is always an aggravating circumstance.’ This idea comes from the psychoanalyst Jacques Lacan, who replaced Freud’s ‘ground-rule’, whereby patients were requested to share with their analyst ‘whatever they thought of ’, with an invitation ‘to say anything, without fear of stupidity’. Swennen makes paintings that remain ‘unimaginable’ until they actually exist. This idea provided him with a way of creating work that was wholly conceived from the point of view of the maker (as opposed to that of the spectator), freed from the so-called necessity to express, share or demonstrate something.

In 1988, the Vlaamse Radio- en Televisieomroeporganisatie produced a documentary on Swennen, directed by Karel Schoetens. At 45 years old, Swennen was the only painter among a younger generation of artists to be selected for the group show Artisti (della Fiandra)/ Artists (from Flanders) (1990) organised at the Palazzo Sagredo in the off-programme of the 44th Venice Biennale.

In 1990, Swennen explained to MuHKA’s director Bart De Baere that he had been struggling with the concepts of figuration and abstraction for some time, but had reached the conclusion that it was a false problem ‘because a painting is always an image of a painting. No matter what it depicts, it is always about a painting.’
 
That same year, Swennen received his second solo exhibition in a public institution at the Palais des Beaux-Arts de Charleroi (1991), curated by Laurent Busine. Reviews summarised his work as “post-Pop art” and credited his timely impulse to simplify painting with an occasional and all-over gridded structure, either painted or ready-made.
 
Gallery shows followed at Nicole Klagsbrun Gallery, New York (1992); Galerie Micheline Szwajcer (1995); Galerie Nadja Vilenne (1996) as did Swennen’s first retrospective at the MuHKA, Antwerp (1994). This was the first solo exhibition dedicated to a painter since the museum opened in 1987. In 2003, the Flemish Community awarded Swennen the annual artist prize.

For La Belgique visionnaire/Visionair België – C’est arrivé près de chez nous (2005) at the Centre for Fine Arts, Brussels, curated by Harald Szeemann before he passed away, Swennen contributed a painting depicting a skull and a funnel— the conventional headpiece of a fool—is integrated into an almost self-deprecating narrative which alludes to Belgium’s distinctly split personality.

Swennen started a collaboration with Nicolas Krupp gallery in Basel in 2006 and was awarded the prize for the best national exhibition by the Brussels Foundation for the Arts for his solo show at Galerie Nadja Vilenne in Liège (2007). A string of gallery exhibitions took place, followed by the solo exhibition How to Paint a Horse, at De Garage, Mechelen and CC Strombeek, Grimbergen. It was not a retrospective, but a wide-ranging selection of paintings, accompanied by a publication with an extensive list of his paintings made to date.

Swennen’s second solo show (2009) at Nicolas Krupp’s gallery elicited attention from the international art press, and raised the question of why Swennen’s work had not yet received international attention, especially given that, in hindsight, “his untailored style of neo-Expressionism seems closer to the New York artists of that time than that to their European counterparts.” (Quinn Latimer)

Recent years 
In 2010, Swennen moved back to Brussels from Antwerp. The Kunstverein Freiburg organised Swennen’s first institutional solo (2011) show outside the Benelux, followed by Continuer (2013), Culturgest in Lisbon. Through a selection of paintings from the last sixteen years, curator Miguel Wandschneider sought to emphasise Swennen’s “ever keener awareness of the specific problems of painting”. A comprehensive list of works from the early 1980s up to the present was established on the occasion of his retrospective So Far So Good (2013) at WIELS. In 2014, Xavier Hufkens became Swennen’s main representing gallery. Other international solo exhibitions followed, including Ein perfektes Alibi, Kunstverein für die Rheinlande und Westfalen, Düsseldorf (2015); White Columns, New York, NY, USA (2017) and La pittura farà da sé, La Triennale di Milano, Milan (2018). A major retrospective is scheduled to take place at Kunstmuseum Bonn in 2021, traveling to Kunstmuseum Den Haag and Kunst Museum Winterthur.
Swennen has been represented by Barbara Gladstone, New York since 2015.

In 2017, Violaine de Villers made a documentary on Swennen, entitled La langue rouge (The Crimson Tongue).

In 2020, Swennen was awarded an Ultima award for visual arts from the Flemish Community, but donated the prize money to the political party Workers' Party of Belgium.

Selected exhibitions 
Swennen has been the focus of several retrospectives at various international institutions, including La pittura farà da sé, La Triennale di Milano, Milan (2018); White Columns, New York, NY, USA (2017); Ein perfektes Alibi, Kunstverein für die Rheinlande und Westfalen, Düsseldorf (2015); So Far So Good, WIELS, Brussels (2013–14); Continuer, Culturgest Lisbon (2013); Garibaldi Slept Here, Kunstverein Freiburg (2012); How To Paint A Horse, Cultuurcentrum Strombeek; De Garage, Mechelen (2008); MuHKA, Antwerp, Belgium (1994) and Schilderijen, Kunsthal, Rotterdam, The Netherlands (1994) and Centre for Fine Arts, Brussels, Belgium (1986). A major retrospective is scheduled to take place at Kunstmuseum Bonn in 2021, traveling to Kunstmuseum Den Haag and Kunst Museum Winterthur.

Public Collections 
Swennen’s work is held in numerous public collections, including the Royal Museums of Fine Arts of Belgium, Brussels, Belgium; MuHKA, Antwerp, Belgium; M-Museum, Leuven, Belgium; MAC’s, Grand-Hornu, Belgium; Mu.ZEE, Ostend, Belgium; Museum of Ixelles, Brussels, Belgium; Beaux-Arts Mons, Mons, Belgium; Centre National des Arts Plastiques, Paris, France; Collection Ministry of Foreign Affairs, Belgium; Collection Ministry of Foreign Affairs, Portugal; Collection of the Flemish Community, Belgium; Collection of the Hainaut Province, Belgium; FRAC Auvergne, Clermont-Ferrand, France; FRAC Bretagne, Rennes, France; FRAC Languedoc-Roussillon, Montpellier, France.

Selected Artist’s Writings and Publications 

2021
 THEYS, H., TOO MANY WORDS, published by Xavier Hufkens, 332p.
2016
 THEYS, H., Hic Haec Hoc, published by Xavier Hufkens, 
2016
THEYS, H., Ne Quid Nimis, published by Zonder Titel 
2015
 SWENNEN, W.; VERSCHAFFEL, B., Works on Paper, published by Xavier Hufkens, 288p.
2013
 SNAUWAERT, D.; PIRENNE, R.; DUMALIN, C. (eds.), Walter Swennen: So Far So Good, published by Les Presses du Réel, 256p. 
2012
 Walter Swennen, L’Antre de la Belle K, photographies de Daniel Dutrieux, edition of 500 copies, published by L’Usine à stars-Galerie Nadja Vilenne, Liège, 
2011
 SWENNEN, W.; I am Afraid I Told a Lie, offset printing on folded map, edition of 100 copies, published by Gevaert Editions, Brussels
2008
 LAMBRECHT, L.; LEEMANS, K. (eds.), Walter Swennen: How To Paint A Horse, published by Grimbergen-Mechelen: Cultuurcentrum Strombeek-De Garage  
2007
  THEYS, H., Congé annuel, Liège: L'usine à stars
2004 
  SWENNEN, W.; PIF. Walter Swennen, Memento. 1 Series, Hornu-Brussels: Musée des Arts Contemporains au Grand-Hornu-La Lettre volée, 
1994
  THEYS, H., Walter Swennen, Antwerp: MUHKA

Notes and references

External links
Nadja Vilenne: Walter Swennen (FR)
Xavier Hufkens: Walter Swennen (EN)
Gladstone Gallery: Walter Swennen (EN)

1946 births
Living people
Belgian artists
Belgian painters
Contemporary painters